The 1998 Australian GT Production Car Championship was a CAMS sanctioned motor racing title for drivers of Group 3E Series Production Cars. The championship, which was promoted by Procar Australia, was the third Australian GT Production Car Championship.

Calendar
The title was contested over an eight round series with two races per round.

The final round had been scheduled to be run at Amaroo Park on 30 August but was moved to Oran Park on the same date.

Points system
Championship points were awarded on a 15-12-10-8-6-5-4-3-2-1 basis to the first ten classified finishers in each race. A bonus point was awarded to the driver setting pole position at each round.

Points for the five class titles were awarded on a similar basis but with no bonus point for pole position.

Results

Classes

References

External links
 PROCAR Site as archived at web.archive.org on 15 April 1998
 NATSOFT Race Result Archive 1998

Australian GT Production Car Championship
GT Production Car Championship
Procar Australia